Purple Rain is a 1984 American rock musical drama film scored by and starring Prince in his acting debut. Developed to showcase his talents, it contains several concert sequences, featuring Prince and his band The Revolution. The film is directed by Albert Magnoli, who later became Prince's manager, from a screenplay by Magnoli and William Blinn. The cast also features Apollonia Kotero, Morris Day, Olga Karlatos and Clarence Williams III.

Principal photography took place almost entirely in Minneapolis: the film features many local landmarks, including the Crystal Court of the IDS Center and the First Avenue nightclub, which was paid $100,000 for the club being used during filming; it was closed for 25 days. Also some of the scenes of First Avenue were shot at The Wiltern in Los Angeles.

Purple Rain grossed over $72 million worldwide, against its $7.2 million budget. The film won an Academy Award for Best Original Song Score. Publications and critics have regarded Purple Rain as one of the greatest musical films. In 2019, the film was selected by the Library of Congress for preservation in the United States National Film Registry for being "culturally, historically, or aesthetically significant".

Purple Rain was supported with its soundtrack album of the same name, which featured two US chart-topping singles, "When Doves Cry" and "Let's Go Crazy", as well as the number-two hit "Purple Rain". The soundtrack is certified 13× Platinum by the Recording Industry Association of America (RIAA) and has sold over 25 million copies worldwide.

Plot
The Kid is the talented but troubled frontman of his Minneapolis-based band, The Revolution. To escape his difficult home life—his father verbally and physically abuses him and his mother—he spends his days rehearsing and his nights performing at the First Avenue nightclub. The Revolution, the flashy Morris Day and his group The Time, and Dez Dickerson and his group The Modernaires hold the nightclub's three house band slots. Morris, aware that The Revolution's guitarist Wendy and keyboardist Lisa are frustrated that The Kid is unwilling to play their compositions, lobbies Billy Sparks, the club's owner, to replace The Revolution with a girl group which Morris is already forming. 

He targets the Kid's girlfriend Apollonia—an aspiring singer and new arrival in Minneapolis—to lead his group, and tries to persuade her that The Kid is too self-centered to help her. She eventually joins Morris's group, which Morris names Apollonia 6. When she reveals her newfound partnership to the Kid, he becomes furious and slaps her, as his father had struck him earlier.

At the club, The Kid responds to the internal band strife, the pressure to draw more crowds, and his strained private life with the uncomfortably personal "Darling Nikki". His performance publicly humiliates Apollonia, who runs off in tears, and angers both Morris and Billy, worsening his situation. Billy confronts the Kid, castigating him for bringing his personal life onto the stage and warning him that he is wasting his musical talent as his father did. Apollonia 6 successfully debuts, and Billy warns the Kid that his First Avenue slot is at risk. 

The Kid seizes Apollonia from a drunken Morris and the two argue and fight; Apollonia then abandons him. Returning home, he finds the house in tatters, with his mother nowhere to be found. When he turns on the basement light, his father—who had been lurking in the basement with a loaded handgun—shoots himself in the head. Frenzied after a night of torment, the Kid tears apart the basement to release his frustration, only to find a large box of his father's musical compositions. The next morning, the Kid picks up a cassette tape of one of Wendy and Lisa's compositions, a rhythm track named "Slow Groove", and begins to compose.

That night at First Avenue, all is quiet in The Revolution's dressing room until The Time stops by to taunt the Kid about his family life. Once on stage, the Kid announces that he will be playing "a song the girls in the band wrote", dedicated to his father—revealed to be "Purple Rain". As the emotional song ends, the Kid rushes from the stage and out the back door of the club, intending to ride away on his motorcycle. However, before he can mount it, he realizes that his new song has thrilled the crowd. 

The Kid returns to the club, with his fellow musicians greeting him with approval and a teary-eyed Apollonia embracing him. The Kid returns to the stage for two encores with The Revolution, to the wild approval of the crowd (even Morris); overlaid scenes show the Kid visiting his father and mother in the hospital and sorting his father's compositions in the basement, accompanied by Apollonia. A montage of all the songs plays as the credits roll.

Cast

 Prince as The Kid
 Apollonia Kotero as Apollonia
 Morris E. Day as himself
 Olga Karlatos as Mother
 Clarence Williams III as Father, a.k.a. "Francis L."
 Jerome Benton as Jerome
 Billy Sparks as Billy
 Jill Jones as Jill
 Dez Dickerson as Dez
 Wendy Melvoin as Wendy
 Lisa Coleman as Lisa
 The Revolution as themselves
 The Time as themselves
 Apollonia 6 as themselves

Production

Development
After the success of his album 1999, Prince confronted his then-manager Robert Cavallo and told him he would not renew his contract with him unless he got to star in a studio film. Every studio they had met with rejected the premise of a musician-led film, leading Cavallo to produce the film himself. David Geffen and Richard Pryor were among those who passed on the film. Prince spent months writing down the basic plot points of the film. Impressed with his work on Fame, Cavallo commissioned William Blinn to write the script. Blinn's original script, titled Dreams, was much darker. 

Reckless director James Foley was offered to direct the film, but was not interested and instead passed it on to his editor Albert Magnoli, who disliked Blinn's script for lacking "truth", and was then hired to direct and edit after delivering a pitch on the spot to Cavallo. Allegedly during the first meeting with Warner Bros., the studio executives asked Cavallo if John Travolta could replace Prince as the film's lead.

Prince intended to cast Vanity, leader of the girl group Vanity 6, but she left the group before filming began. Her role was initially offered to Jennifer Beals (who turned it down because she wanted to concentrate on college) before going to Apollonia Kotero, who was then virtually unknown. Prince had seen her appearance on the February 1983 episode of Tales of the Gold Monkey, in which she played a saucy island girl (inspired by Jamie Muller, the only person who Prince trusted to cut the grass of his Minnesota home at the time of filming) who was sleeping with a German man of the cloth. Excluding Prince and his onscreen parents, almost every character in the movie is named after the actor who plays him or her. Kotero was the last to audition and caught the eye of Magnoli. Kotero had no background in singing and was doubled by Lisa Coleman in her vocals on "Take Me With U".

After the character change from Vanity to Apollonia, the script was drastically revised, and many dark scenes were cut. Some of these scenes include Prince and Apollonia having sex in a barn (a concept which was the story behind the 1985 song "Raspberry Beret"); Prince going to Apollonia 6's rehearsal and physically fighting with the members of The Time; and a scene which featured Prince's mother talking to him about her shaky relationship with his father. In addition, many scenes such as the "Lake Minnetonka" scene, Apollonia first meeting Morris, and the railyard scene were cut down because of time constraints. Many clips from these scenes were featured, however, in the trailer for the movie as well as the "When Doves Cry" and "Let's Go Crazy" montage. Prince required the other musicians in the film to take acting classes prior to filming. Morris Day was supposedly kicked out of the classes for "clowning around".

Filming
Principal photography began on October 31, 1983, in Minneapolis, Minnesota and spanned 42 days. The film features many local landmarks, including the Crystal Court of the IDS Center (also shown in segments of the opening credits to The Mary Tyler Moore Show) and the First Avenue nightclub, which was paid $100,000 for usage during filming and was closed for 25 days. According to Alan Leeds, several days of shooting were altered due to Day refusing to show up to set due to a rivalry with Prince.

The Huntington Hotel, where Apollonia stayed, is located on Main Street in downtown Los Angeles. In the film, it is supposed to be across the street from First Avenue. In the film, Prince rides a customized Hondamatic Honda CM400A motorcycle. The road north from Henderson Station, Minnesota along the Minnesota River was the setting for the motorcycle ride scenes.

During production, Magnoli asked Prince to write one more song that touched on the themes of the film. The following day, Prince already had the song, "When Doves Cry", fully produced.

Although Warner Bros. considered the film "outrageous" at the time, it was accepted for distribution after an internal debate. Music industry publicist Howard Bloom had advocated for the film to be released and said that "killing Purple Rain would be a sin against art!".

Music

The film is tied into the album of the same name, which spawned two chart-topping singles, "When Doves Cry" and the opening number "Let's Go Crazy", as well as "Purple Rain", which reached number two. The film won an Academy Award for Best Original Song Score. The soundtrack sold over 15 million copies in America alone, and 25 million worldwide. The film also coincided with spin-off albums by The Time (Ice Cream Castle) and Apollonia 6 (their self-titled album).

 "Let's Go Crazy" – Prince and the Revolution
 "Jungle Love" –  The Time
 "Take Me with U" –  Prince and the Revolution featuring Apollonia
 "Modernaire" – Dez Dickerson and the Modernaires
 "Possessed" – Prince and the Revolution
 "The Beautiful Ones" – Prince and the Revolution
 "God (Love Theme from Purple Rain)"  – Prince
 "When Doves Cry" – Prince
 “Father’s Song” - Prince
 "Computer Blue" – Prince and the Revolution
 "Darling Nikki" – Prince and the Revolution
 "Sex Shooter" – Apollonia 6
 "The Bird" – The Time
 "Purple Rain" – Prince and the Revolution
 "I Would Die 4 U" – Prince and the Revolution
 "Baby I'm a Star" – Prince and the Revolution

Release
Purple Rain was released on July 27, 1984, by Warner Bros. Pictures.

Home media
Warner Home Video first released Purple Rain on video in 1984 while the film was still in theaters. At the time it was one of the first major releases to be sold at the lower listed price of $29.95 in the United States. It shipped 435,000 units. It was released on DVD in 1999. The film was first released on Blu-ray on July 24, 2007 and was released on Blu-ray again with a new remaster on October 4, 2016, as part of the Prince Movie Collection.

Reception

Box office
The film was commercially successful, grossing $68,392,977 in the United States.

Critical response
Purple Rain received generally positive reviews from critics. On Rotten Tomatoes, the film has a 70% rating based on 56 reviews, with an average rating of 6.39/10. The website's critical consensus reads: "Purple Rain makes for undeniably uneven cinema, but it's held together by its star's singular charisma – not to mention a slew of classic songs." On Metacritic, it has a score of 55 out of 100 based on 14 reviews, indicating "mixed or average reviews". Prince famously said after the movie opened that he had a nightmare that Roger Ebert and Gene Siskel hated the movie and tore it apart on their TV show; in fact, both critics loved Purple Rain and put it on their Top 10 lists of the best films in 1984. Roger Ebert would go on to call it "one of the greatest rock movies of all time".

Accolades

The film is recognized by American Film Institute in these lists:
 2004: AFI's 100 Years...100 Songs:
 "Let's Go Crazy" – Nominated
 2006: AFI's Greatest Movie Musicals – Nominated

Legacy
Purple Rain is the only feature film that Prince starred in but did not direct. A standalone sequel, Graffiti Bridge, was released in 1990.

After Prince's death on April 21, 2016, MTV aired the film following a music video marathon. VH1 also showed the movie the same night, as well as throughout the next couple of days.
Theater chains AMC and Carmike held tribute screenings of the film at a limited number of theaters the following week, from April 27 to May 1, 2016.

A Tuareg-language homage to the film, entitled Akounak Tedalat Taha Tazoughai, which translates as "Rain the Color of Blue with a Little Red In It", was released in 2015 and stars the Nigerien guitarist Mdou Moctar. Eminem's feature film, 8 Mile, which is loosely based on his life, also is often compared to Purple Rain.

Eight months before his death, Prince purchased the house of “The Kid” in Minneapolis. Located on Snelling Avenue in the Longfellow community, it was used for exterior scenes in the movie. The house, which the Prince estate owns, is a popular tourist destination for fans of the film.

References

External links
 
 
 
 
 

Prince (musician)
1984 films
1980s musical drama films
American neo-noir films
American musical drama films
American rock music films
American rock musicals
1980s English-language films
Films about interracial romance
Films about musical groups
Films directed by Albert Magnoli
Films that won the Best Original Score Academy Award
Films set in Minnesota
Films shot in Minnesota
Warner Bros. films
Films about domestic violence
Films scored by Michel Colombier
United States National Film Registry films
1984 directorial debut films
1984 drama films
Films set in Minneapolis
1980s American films